Galloping Vengeance is a 1925 American silent Western film directed by William James Craft and starring Bob Custer, Mary Beth Milford, and Ralph McCullough.

Plot
As described in a film magazine review, Texas Ranger Tom Hardy is assigned to find an Indian chief who has been kidnapped by Duke Granby and his gang, who seek valuable oil lands. Jack Reeves, brother of Marion with whom Tom is in love, becomes mixed up with Granby. During a fight a man is killed and Jack is made to believe that he killed the man. Tom finds the chief, forces Granby to confess to the murder, and rescues Marion from a torrent caused when one of Granby's men dynamites a dam.

Cast
 Bob Custer as Tom Hardy 
 Mary Beth Milford as Marion Reeves 
 Ralph McCullough as Jack Reeves 
 Dorothy Ponedel as Little Wolf 
 David Dunbar as Duke Granby

References

External links
 

1925 films
1925 Western (genre) films
American black-and-white films
Film Booking Offices of America films
Films directed by William James Craft
Silent American Western (genre) films
1920s English-language films
1920s American films